Financial Centre (Arabic:) is a rapid transit station on the Red Line of the Dubai Metro in Dubai, UAE.

History
Financial Centre station opened on 9 September 2009 as part of the initial stretch of the Red Line, with trains running between Rashidiya and Nakheel Harbour and Tower. Other stations on the Red Line opened progressively over 2010 and 2011.

Location
Located southwest of the historic centre of Dubai, Financial Centre station lies between Bur Dubai and many of the city's larger new developments. To the east is the Dubai International Financial Centre (DIFC), after which the station is named. Nearby residential buildings include The Index and the Park Towers at DIFC, as well as numerous hotels.

Station layout
Like many other stations on the Red Line, Financial Centre lies on a viaduct paralleling the eastern side of Sheikh Zayed Road. It is classified as a type 2 station, indicating a setup with an elevated concourse and two side platforms with two tracks.

Platform layout

References

Railway stations in the United Arab Emirates opened in 2009
Dubai Metro stations